Soňa Pertlová (March 24, 1988 in Třinec – May 8, 2011 in Třinec) was a Czech chess player.

Biography
Pertlová was the Czech U12 girl champion in 2000, U16 champion in 2002 and U20 champion in 2007. She finished second in Czech U18 championship in 2006. 

She played for the Czech team in the 2008 Chess Olympiad in Dresden, scoring 4 points out of 6 games while being treated for cancer and the European women's team championships in 2005 and 2009. She received the title of Woman FIDE Master (WFM) in 2006 and Woman International Master (WIM) in 2008. She worked several times in Czech television, namely on the show V šachu (In chess).

References

External links 

WIM Sona Pertlova passes away; A fighter on the chess board and in life
David Navara: Soňa Pertlová - In memoriam
Sbohem třinecká růže
personal blog on Prague chess society web

1988 births
2011 deaths
Chess Olympiad competitors
Czech female chess players
Chess Woman International Masters
Deaths from cancer in the Czech Republic
Sportspeople from Třinec